This is a list of notable Spaniards in the United Kingdom who have at least one Spanish parent, ordered by surname within section.

Actors 

 Douglas Booth, actor, mother of Spanish ancestry
 Oona Chaplin, actress, Spanish citizen
 Roger Delgado, actor, played The Master in Doctor Who, Spanish father
 Dafne Keen, actress, played Laura in Logan, Spanish mother
 John Charles Marquez, actor and a writer, best known for his role as PC Joe Penhale in ITV drama series Doc Martin (2007–present) and Ray Wilson in BBC One's drama In the Club (2014–present). 
 Patricia Medina, actress in the 1940s-60s; Spanish father
 Martin Marquez, actor, Spanish father
 Alfred Molina, actor of stage & screen, Spanish father
 Ana Mulvoy-Ten, actress, Spanish mother
 Natalia Tena, actress, played Nymphadora Tonks in the Harry Potter film series and Osha in HBOs Game of Thrones, Spanish parents

Artists 
 Angela de la Cruz, painter, nominated for the Turner Prize in 2010
 John Galliano, fashion designer, Spanish mother 
 Cristina de Middel, photographer
 Tamara Rojo, ballet dancer, currently the artistic director of the English National Ballet, previously the principal dancer with The Royal Ballet

Business
 Ana Patricia Botín, CEO of Santander UK, the third largest bank in the UK in terms of deposits

Lawyers
 Miriam González Durántez, wife of former Liberal Democrat Party Leader and former Deputy Prime Minister of the United Kingdom, Rt Hon Nick Clegg MP

Musicians 
 Carlos Bonell, guitarist
 Paloma Faith, singer; Spanish father
 Geri Halliwell, singer; Spanish mother from Huesca.
 Lita Roza, singer; Spanish father

Politicians
Michael Portillo, politician and broadcaster; Spanish father

Royalty

Edward II of England, Spanish mother, Eleanor of Castile
Mary I of England, Queen of England and Ireland, Queen Consort of Spain, Sicily and Naples; Spanish mother, Catherine of Aragon

Scholars
 Felipe Fernández-Armesto, British historian and author of several popular books on revisionist history; Spanish father
 Charles Powell, Director of the Elcano Royal Institute (Madrid) since 28 March 2012; Spanish mother

Sports
 Eva Carneiro, sports doctor; Spanish father
 Joe Gomez, footballer; Spanish mother
 Sam Hidalgo-Clyne, rugby union player
 Adam Lallana, footballer; Spanish grandfather
 Nacho Novo, footballer
 Jay Rodriguez, footballer; Spanish Paternal Grandparents

Writers
 John Carlin, journalist; Scottish father, Spanish mother
 Joseph Blanco White, Roman Catholic (later, Anglican and Unitarian) theologian and poet in Spanish and English; born in Spain; Spanish father of Irish descent, Spanish mother

See also
Latin Americans in the United Kingdom

References

 
Spanish
Spaniards